Savnt (born Stephan Marcellus; October 13, 1995) is an American vocalist and songwriter from Englewood, New Jersey.

Marcellus competed on the 13th season of NBC's television series The Voice. He later released several singles and collaborations with other recording artists.

Discography

Studio Albums 

Renegade (2018)

EPs 
 Rock & Blues (2021)

Singles

Guest appearances

References

External links

 

1991 births
Living people
21st-century American musicians
Musicians from Inglewood, California
People from Englewood, New Jersey
21st-century African-American male singers
African-American record producers
Record producers from California
American male pop singers
American hip hop singers
American multi-instrumentalists
The Voice (franchise) contestants
21st-century American singers
21st-century American male singers